Charles G. Case II is a Federal Bankruptcy Court Judge for the United States bankruptcy court, District of Arizona. He was appointed on January 5, 1994 and reappointed on January 5, 2009.

Education
Judge Case graduated cum laude from Harvard University with his Bachelor of Arts degree.  Later he graduated magna cum laude from Arizona State University College of Law with his Juris Doctor.

Legal career
From 1975 to 1988, Case practiced with the law firm of Lewis and Roca in Phoenix.  Before his appointment in 1994 he was a member of the Phoenix law firm of Meyer, Hendricks, Victor, Osborn & Maledon, P.A., where he concentrated in bankruptcy, Chapter 11 reorganizations, secured transactions and commercial litigation.

Positions and memberships
Case is a fellow of the American College of Bankruptcy and a member of the American Law Institute, the International Insolvency Institute, the International Exchange of Experience in Insolvency, and the American Bankruptcy Institute. He was also the President of the National Conference of Bankruptcy Judges and a former member of the Board of the Harvard Alumni Association.

External links
 District of Arizona bankruptcy court

References

Judges of the United States bankruptcy courts
Living people
Harvard University alumni
Sandra Day O'Connor College of Law alumni
Year of birth missing (living people)